Dasyponyssidae is a small family of mites in the order Mesostigmata.

Species
Dasyponyssidae contains two genera, with two recognized species:

 Genus Dasyponyssus Fonseca, 1940
 Dasyponyssus neivai Fonseca, 1940
 Genus Xenarthronyssus Radovsky & Yunker, 1971
 Xenarthronyssus furmani Radovsky & Yunker, 1971

References

Mesostigmata
Acari families